The 1927–28 Yorkshire Cup tournament was the 20th occasion on which the competition had been held. Dewsbury won the trophy by beating Hull F.C. in the final by the score of 8-2. The match was played at Headingley, Leeds, now in West Yorkshire. The attendance was 21,700 and receipts were £1,466. This was Dewsbury's second triumph in a three-year period having last won the trophy in 1925–26.

Background 
The Rugby Football League's Yorkshire Cup competition was a knock-out competition between (mainly professional) rugby league clubs from  the  county of Yorkshire. The actual area was at times increased to encompass other teams from  outside the  county such as Newcastle, Mansfield, Coventry, and even London (in the form of Acton & Willesden. The Rugby League season always (until the onset of "Summer Rugby" in 1996) ran from around August-time through to around May-time and this competition always took place early in the season, in the Autumn, with the final taking place in (or just before) December (The only exception to this was when disruption of the fixture list was caused during, and immediately after, the two World Wars).

Competition and results  
This season there were no junior/amateur clubs taking part, no new entrants and no "leavers" and so the total of entries remained the same at fifteen. This in turn resulted in one bye in the first round.

Round 1 
Involved  7 matches (with one bye) and 15 clubs

Round 1 - replays  
Involved  1 match and 2 clubs

Round 2 – quarterfinals 
Involved 4 matches and 8 clubs

Round 2 - replays  
Involved  1 match and 2 clubs

Round 3 – semifinals  
Involved 2 matches and 4 clubs

Final

Teams and scorers 

Scoring - Try = three (3) points - Goal = two (2) points - Drop goal = two (2) points

The road to success

Notes 
1 * The first Yorkshire Cup game to be played at Castleford's new stadium

2 * The official Hull F.C. archives give the venue as Sandy Desert but according to the official Castleford Tiugers website they moved from this ground in 1926 (or 1927 - depending on the article). Other references (including Wikipedia's Castleford] also add confusion to the date of the move

3 * The  venue is given as Crown Flatt by RUGBYLEAGUEproject  but as Headingley by the  Rothmans Rugby League Yearbook of 1991-92 and 1990-91

4 * Headingley, Leeds, is the home ground of Leeds RLFC with a capacity of 21,000. The record attendance was  40,175 for a league match between Leeds and Bradford Northern on 21 May 1947.

See also 
1927–28 Northern Rugby Football League season
Rugby league county cups

References

External links
Saints Heritage Society
1896–97 Northern Rugby Football Union season at wigan.rlfans.com
Hull&Proud Fixtures & Results 1896/1897
Widnes Vikings - One team, one passion Season In Review - 1896-97
The Northern Union at warringtonwolves.org

RFL Yorkshire Cup
Yorkshire Cup